Tim McKeon is an American writer, director and producer. He is the co-creator and head writer for the American-Canadian series Odd Squad. He has also worked as a writer on Cartoon Network's Adventure Time, Foster’s Home for Imaginary Friends, as well as Disney Channel's Gravity Falls. McKeon is currently the creator and showrunner of the Apple TV+ series Helpsters.

Screenwriting credits

Television
Note: Series head writer denoted in bold:
 Sitting Ducks (2001)
 Sunday Pants (2005)
 The Life and Times of Juniper Lee (2005–2006)
 Foster’s Home for Imaginary Friends (2005–2009)
 The Grim Adventures of Billy & Mandy (2006–2007)
 Out of Jimmy’s Head  (2007–2008)
 Destination: Imagination (2008)
 Adventure Time (2010-2013)
 Fish Hooks (2010–2013)
 Gravity Falls (2012)
 Wander Over Yonder (2013-2014)
 Wallykazam! (2014)
 Odd Squad (2014–present)
 Molly of Denali (2019–2020)
 DC Superhero Girls (2019)
 Helpsters (2019–present)
 Hilda (2020)
 Sesame Street (2021-present)
 Kid Cosmic (2021–2022)

Films
 Re-Animated (2006)
 Odd Squad: The Movie (2016)
 Odd Squad: World Turned Odd (2018)

References

External links
 

Living people
American television producers
Primetime Emmy Award winners
Cartoon Network Studios people
Year of birth missing (living people)